The South African Embassy in Washington, D.C. is the diplomatic mission of the Republic of South Africa to the United States. It is located at 3051 Massachusetts Avenue, Northwest, Washington, D.C. in the Embassy Row neighborhood.

History
South Africa sent its first delegation to the United States in 1929.  In 1949 it was raised to a formal embassy. The embassy buildings were built in 1936. Previously the delegation had been housed in a series of leased properties.

The original portion now serves as the ambassadorial residence and a new chancery wing was built next door in 1964. 
Both structures are in the Cape Dutch style, but with Indiana limestone instead of the traditional whitewashed plaster. 
The complex is no longer large enough to house the entire ambassadorial delegation service, and is being renovated.

The embassy is temporarily located at 4000 Connecticut Avenue NW, and several offices are located in an annex at 4301 Connecticut Ave NW Suite 220.

See also
 Statue of Nelson Mandela (Washington, D.C.), sculpture of Nelson Mandela by Jean Doyle, installed outside the embassy in 2013
 South Africa Ambassador to United States

References

External links

Official site
wikimapia

South Africa
Washington, D.C.
South Africa–United States relations
South Africa